An Amateur Concert is an oil painting on canvas by the Portuguese painter Columbano Bordalo Pinheiro of 1882.

Description
The painting measures 220 cm and 300 cm wide. It is in the collection of the Chiado Museum in Lisbon. Five people are singing and playing in the dark: Maria Augusta Bordalo Pinheiro, the artist's sister, in a white satin dress; next to her, the painter Adolfo Greno in right profile; then an Italian singer in a dark suit; in the background Josefa Greno, in a three-quarters view, looking down; and on the far right another painter, Artur Loureiro, at the piano.

Analysis
The large painting was presented at the 1882 Paris Salon under the title Soirée chez lui. The oval composition shows the social circle. It is friendship that unites them both in painting and music, though a shadowy unknown figure next to the piano is watching. In France it was not received well, and in Portugal there was controversy about the abstract and vague figures.

References
 

1882 paintings
Portuguese paintings
Musical instruments in art